Kul Prasad KC was sworn in as Chief Minister of Lumbini Province on 12 August 2021. He became second chief minister of Lumbini after Shankar Pokharel resigned reaching minority.

Nepali Congress, the second largest party in assembly, played vital role in government formation. There has been power sharing understanding as per which CPN(Maoist Centre) will handover government leadership to Nepali Congress in few months.

Here is a full list of cabinet ministers.

Chief minister and cabinet ministers

Member by party

See also 
 Rajendra Kumar Rai cabinet
 Lalbabu Raut cabinet
  Rajendra Prasad Pandey cabinet
 Krishna Chandra Nepali cabinet
 Jeevan Bahadur Shahi cabinet
 Trilochan Bhatta cabinet

References

External links 

 Lumbini Province official website
 Cabinet of Lumbini Province

Government of Lumbini Province
Provincial cabinets of Nepal
History of Lumbini Province
2021 establishments in Nepal
2023 disestablishments in Nepal